The 2002 Big 12 Conference softball tournament was held at ASA Hall of Fame Stadium in Oklahoma City, OK from May 2 through May 5, 2002. Texas won their second conference tournament and earned the Big 12 Conference's automatic bid to the 2002 NCAA Division I softball tournament. 

Oklahoma and Nebraska would go on to play in the 2002 Women's College World Series.

Standings
Source:

Schedule
Source:

All-Tournament Team
Source:

References

Big 12 Conference softball tournament
Tournament
Big 12 softball tournament